James McVay (1889–1950) was an English footballer who played for Stoke.

Career
McVay was born in Wallsend and played for Wallsend Swifts before joining Stoke in 1912. He played twelve times for Stoke before returning to the North East.

Career statistics

References

English footballers
Stoke City F.C. players
1889 births
1950 deaths
Association football defenders